The Garuda Contingent, abbreviated KONGA, is a group of peacekeepers drawn from the Indonesian military; currently titled Tentara Nasional Indonesia (TNI) and originally known as Angkatan Perang RI, that serve with the United Nations (UN).

History and operations
The Garuda Contingent was first deployed (KONGA I) to Egypt and Israel on 27 November 1956, as part of the United Nations Emergency Force (UNEF) to secure and monitor a ceasefire in Egypt, remaining until September 1957.  It was initially under the command of Lieutenant Colonel Hartoyo, who was subsequently replaced by Lieutenant Colonel Suhadi Suromihardjo.

The next two contingents were sent to the Congo, then known as Zaire.  The first contingent (KONGA II) consisted of a battalion (Batalyon Angkatan Darat Republik Indonesia) of 1,074 troops, and was led by Colonel Prijatna (later replaced by Lieutenant Colonel Solichin); this contingent served from September 1960 to May 1961.  The second contingent (KONGA III) returning to Zaire consisted of 3,457 troops selected from a number of units of the Indonesian Army; namely the Battalion 531 (Raiders), Kodam II (Bukit Barisan), the 7th Cavalry Battalion, with support from combat assistance elements.  KONGA III was led by Brigadier General Kemal Idris (later replaced by Colonel Sabirin Mochtar); this contingent served from 1962 to the end of 1963, and saw one casualty; Colonel GA. Manulang, commander 7th Cavalry Battalion lost his life.  Notably, KONGA III also included a journalist, H.A. Manan Karim, from Medan.

The Garuda Contingent's fourth (KONGA IV) and fifth (KONGA V) deployments were to Vietnam in 1973 and 1974, towards the end of the Vietnam War.  This was followed by a sixth (KONGA VI) deployment to Egypt after the Yom Kippur War under the command of Colonel Rudini.  The Garuda Contingent later returned to Vietnam and Egypt for a seventh and eighth deployment, respectively.

After an eight-year hiatus, the Garuda Contingent deployed as part of the United Nations Iran–Iraq Military Observer Group under the command of Lieutenant Colonel Endriartono Sutarto, then Lieutenant Colonel Fachrul Razi and Johny Lumintang.

In 1992, five Garuda Contingent members participated in the United Nations Operation in Somalia I under the command of Lieutenant Colonel Bibit Santoso.  This was later reduced to four soldiers, under the command of Major CZI Budiman.

During the Bosnian War, the Garuda Contingent XIV deployed medical officers and military observers in their fifteenth mission.  This was not well received by the Indonesian populace, who wished that the soldiers took a more active, military role.  This was followed by a deployment to Georgia and a 15-man deployment to Mozambique in 1994.  That same year, they were also deployed to the Philippines under the command of Brigadier General Asmardi Arbi (later replaced by Brigadier General Kivlan Zein) to help deal with the conflict between the Moro National Liberation Front and the Philippine government.

In November 1997, Garuda Contingent XVIII consisted of eight TNI officers deployed to Tajikistan, under the command of Major Can Suyatno.

Less than two years later, Garuda Contingent XIX deployed to Sierra Leone in 1999, remaining until 2002.  XIX-1 comprised ten TNI officers led by Lt Col K. Dwi Pujianto.  KONGA XIX-2 also included ten officers, led by Lt Col PSK Amarullah.  KONGA XIX-3's ten officers were led by Lt Col (P) Dwi Wahyu Aguk.  The final element in Sierra Leone, KONGA XIX-4, also included ten officers, led by Major CZI Benny Oktaviar MDA, who was mission tasked as an observer.

In 2003, the Garuda Contingent XX-A deployed on its twentieth mission, to the Democratic Republic of the Congo in central Africa.  A total of 171 troops deployed originally, including 32 medical staff and 28 marines.  They were deployed with peacekeepers from Nepal, India, and Bangladesh, with the peacekeeping mission being led by France.  As of 2009, the focus had shifted to infrastructure, and a seventh contingent had been deployed.

The Garuda Contingent was part of the United Nations Interim Force in Lebanon.  In August 2010, two of its soldiers were criticised after they escaped from clashes between Israel and Lebanon by fleeing in a taxi.

Deployments

References

Footnotes

Bibliography

Government agencies established in 1956
Military of Indonesia
Military operations other than war
Peacekeeping
Lebanon and the United Nations
Lebanon